Odostomia lorioli is a species of sea snail, a marine gastropod mollusc in the family Pyramidellidae, the pyrams and their allies.

Description
The shell grows to a length of 2 mm.

Distribution
This species occurs in the following locations:
 Mediterranean Sea as an invasive species

References

External links
 
 To CLEMAM
 To Encyclopedia of Life
 To World Register of Marine Species

lorioli
Gastropods described in 1924